The Statutes of Casimir the Great or Piotrków-Wiślica Statutes are a collection of laws issued by Casimir III the Great, the king of Poland, in the years 1346-1362 during congresses in Piotrków and Wiślica. It was the first and the only significant codification of laws during the times of the Piast dynasty.

Background
In the middle of the 12th century, following the ill-thought testament of Bolesław III Krzywousty, his sons begun the process of fragmentation of Poland.  It would take Polish rulers over two centuries to unite most of the lands that Bolesław controlled under one ruler. This was achieved in the 14th century by Władysław I Łokietek.  Władysław's son, Casimir III the Great, earned his singular reputation not through military exploits but through his acumen as a builder, administrator and diplomat. One of his project included an attempt to unify and codify law in the lands he controlled, in the attempt to build stronger ties between different provinces, and to tie them more tightly to the central government.

In the end, due to opposition from various factions, which saw the codification and unification of the legal system in the Kingdom of Poland as weakening their position, Casimir was not able to fully accomplish his task. He was nonetheless able to do so in two major provinces of Poland. The Piotrków statute regulated the law in Greater Poland (Wielkopolska), and the Wiślica statute in Lesser Poland (Małopolska).

The date specific statutes were passed is not certain; it is accepted that most work was done in the years 1346-1362, that it took multiple congresses (wiec), and that both statutes were finished by 1362. Further, historians now agree that the Statutes were partially written after the death of Casimir, and later the entire work was incorrectly attributed to him.

Statutes
About 2/3 of the Statutes concerned the criminal law; the rest, private (civil) law.

Characteristically, most statutes contain not only the law, but explanation (justification) for why it exists.

The Statutes were written in Latin. In the early 15th century they were translated into Polish and later, into Ruthenian. In the late 15th century they were printed.

Importance
The statutes for the first time in Poland codified the existing legal customs. They would form the basis of the Polish law in centuries to come, and would be expanded by codification of other customs, precedents and passing of other legal acts. They also succeeded in uniting the country.

Notes

External links
Ḟedor Ḟedorovīch Zigel, Lectures on Slavonic law: being the Ilchester lectures for the year 1900, p. 115-118,  Google Print (public domain book)
 Statuty Kazimierza Wielkiego, Encyklopedia Internautica

14th century in law
Medieval legal codes
Legal history of Poland
Casimir III the Great
14th century in Poland